The Paturau River (sometimes spelt Patarau) is a river of the Tasman Region of New Zealand's South Island. One of the northernmost rivers in  the South Island, it flows predominantly north from its sources in the Wakamarama Range to reach the Tasman Sea 20 kilometres west of Collingwood.

See also
List of rivers of New Zealand

References

Rivers of the Tasman District
Rivers of New Zealand